Edinburgh United Football Club is a Scottish football club, based in the Colinton area of Edinburgh. Formed in 1985, the team competes in the East of Scotland Football League First Division Conference B, having moved from the junior leagues in 2018. The club play their home games at Paties Road Recreation Ground in the south-west of the city, which holds around 2,500 spectators and features a 200 seater stand. The team play in black and white strips.

Edinburgh United were the sole "Junior" club in Edinburgh for the majority of their time in the Junior leagues, with all other non-league clubs either playing in the senior East of Scotland Football League or latterly the Lowland Football League. Spartans ran a Junior team for four seasons from 2009 to 2013, while Warriston based Craigroyston joined the Junior setup from 2016. Both clubs moved into the East of Scotland League in 2018.

The team have been managed since October 2018 by Ian Flynn.

Edinburgh united also have a youth section catering for ages from 5-16 and play in the ESSDA leagues. More information at http://www.Edinburghunitedyouths.co.uk

Honours

Fife & Lothians (Heineken) Cup: 1988–89
East Region Division Two winners: 1985–86
Brown Cup: 1986–87, 1988–89
South Region Division: 2013–14

References

 
Association football clubs established in 1985
Football clubs in Scotland
Scottish Junior Football Association clubs
Football clubs in Edinburgh
1985 establishments in Scotland
East of Scotland Football League teams